State Road A1A (SR A1A) is a major north–south Florida State Road that runs  along the Atlantic Ocean, from Key West at the southern tip of Florida, to Fernandina Beach, just south of Georgia on Amelia Island. It is the main road through most oceanfront towns. Part of SR A1A is designated the A1A Scenic and Historic Coastal Byway, a National Scenic Byway. A portion of SR A1A that passes through Volusia County is designated the Ormond Scenic Loop and Trail, a Florida Scenic Highway. It is also called the Indian River Lagoon Scenic Highway from State Road 510 at Wabasso Beach to U.S. Route 1 in Cocoa. SR A1A is famous worldwide as a center of beach culture in the United States, a scenic coastal route through most Atlantic coastal cities and beach towns, including the unique tropical coral islands of the Florida Keys. SR A1A also serves as a major thoroughfare through Miami Beach and other south Florida coastal cities.

Other than SR A1A Alternate (now SR 811, CR 707, SR 732, and an extension of SR 842), only two other Florida state roads have begun with a letter: SR A19A (now a loop of SR 693–SR 699–SR 682 near St. Petersburg), and SR G1A (now SR 300).

The road was designated as State Road 1 in the 1945 renumbering, mostly replacing the former State Road 140 designation. The number reflected its location in the new grid as the easternmost major north–south road. About a year and a half later, in November 1946, the State Road Board resolved to renumber the route due to confusion with the parallel U.S. Highway 1. The new designation, A1A, was chosen to keep the number 1 in its place in the grid.

The East Coast Greenway, a system of trails that connects Maine to Florida, travels along sections of SR A1A.

Route description

SR A1A is heavily associated with Florida beach culture and is known for its lush tropical and subtropical scenery and ocean vistas. In many places, the highway runs directly along the waterfront of the Atlantic Ocean, but in other places, it runs one to five blocks inland from the beachfront. For most of its length, SR A1A runs along Florida's East Coast Barrier Islands, separated from the mainland of the state by the Intracoastal Waterway. Because of the proximity of the highway to the ocean and its susceptibility to storm surges, sections of SR A1A are often closed or damaged by hurricanes and tropical storms.

SR A1A also has been a backbone of Florida's Spring Break serving as "the strip" in both Fort Lauderdale – a popular spring break destination during the 1960s, 1970s, and 1980s – and Daytona Beach, which became a popular destination for college spring breaks during the 1970s. Today, SR A1A serves as more a main coastal highway that connects beach towns for more than 375 miles along Florida's East Coast.

The southern terminus of SR A1A is at the southern end of Bertha Street, where SR A1A begins as a two-lane, then a four-lane highway along the Straits of Florida in Key West, known locally as South Roosevelt Boulevard. The road heads east past East Martello Tower and Key West International Airport, before curving north with an intersection with CR 5A (Flagler Avenue), followed by the northern terminus of the Key West section of SR A1A, U.S. Route 1 and State Road 5 (the Overseas Highway).  Running along the south shore of Key West, SR A1A is the southmost numbered highway in the lower 48 states.

SR A1A reappears at Interstate 395 and US 1 in Miami, beginning at MacArthur Causeway before becoming Collins Avenue at Fifth Street in Miami Beach (or, in small segments, Harding Avenue, Abbott Avenue, or Indian Creek Drive), serving as one of Miami Beach's main north — south thoroughfares.  Just north in the town of Surfside, the northbound is Collins Avenue, and the southbound is Harding Avenue. In Bal Harbour it is called Bal Harbour Boulevard. In Golden Beach it is called Ocean Boulevard.

It serves Hallandale Beach, Hollywood Beach, and Dania Beach. It joins with US 1 for 3.4 miles, and passes the Fort Lauderdale–Hollywood International Airport. It then divides and serves Fort Lauderdale, Pompano Beach, and continuing north.

It serves as the main road throughout much of the exclusive Palm Beach, further to the north.

In the area of Vero Beach, SR A1A is called the Robert C. Spillman Memorial Highway, and it spans Sebastian Inlet at the Sebastian Inlet Bridge.

SR A1A next passes just to the west of Cape Canaveral and the John F. Kennedy Space Center.

Two miles of SR A1A were used as part of the well-known Daytona Beach Road Course.

SR A1A also passes through St. Augustine, the oldest continuously-inhabited city on the mainland of the United States.

SR A1A is called 3rd Street in Jacksonville Beach and Neptune Beach.

Just south of Atlantic Beach, SR A1A turns inland for several blocks, following Atlantic Boulevard, before resuming a northward course along Mayport Road that ends at the St. Johns River. A ferry takes traffic to the northern section of SR A1A that continues along the coast to just south of Fort Clinch State Park on the estuary of the Saint Mary's River. At that point SR A1A hooks back south to Fernandina Beach and then turns west, going inland 20 miles through Yulee and crossing I-95 and U.S. Highway 17. It ends at U.S. Highway 1, U.S. Highway 23, and U.S. Highway 301 in Callahan. This section west of Fernandina Beach, is also marked as SR 200, but SR A1A signs are displayed at every cluster of signs, though a designated direction is only above the SR 200 signs.

History

Pre-1945 alignment

Prior to the 1945 renumbering, the route that became SR 1 had the following numbers:

Initial alignment

SR 1 was defined in the 1945 renumbering as:

Alignment modifications
Since then, the following changes have been made:

Jungle Trail

The Jungle Trail (pre-1945 State Road 252) was part of A1A in northeastern Indian River County, Florida. The narrow,  road is located between Old Winter Beach Road and the current A1A, along the western side of Orchid Island, and is unpaved. It is part of the Indian River Lagoon Scenic Highway system, and the southernmost road in the highway system. Part of the trail goes through the Pelican Island National Wildlife Refuge.

The road started as a means to quickly transport citrus to packinghouses on the mainland, then in the 1930s and 1940s became more used by tourists. On August 1, 2003, it was added to the United States National Register of Historic Places.

Major intersections

County Road A1A

County Road A1A is a county road in four counties in the U.S. state of Florida.  The route is discontinuous and functions as a spur of State Road A1A.

Palm Beach County
CR A1A in Palm Beach County is a former routing of SR A1A through Juno Beach and Jupiter. It serves as a paralleling alternate route to Federal Highway (US 1), and is often erroneously signed as SR A1A despite its official county designation and maintenance.

Martin County
The longest of the four county spurs, County Road A1A is  that runs along the Florida East Coast Railroad main line from Jonathan Dickinson State Park in Hobe Sound to Stuart, where it suddenly changes course and runs east along the south coast of the St. Lucie River. After the terminus of SR 714, it approaches the Evans Crary Bridge separating Stuart and Sewall's Point and becomes SR A1A.

Volusia County

County Road A1A is a  spur route of State Road A1A in Volusia County, Florida, United States.  The route begins at U.S. Route 1 and State Road A1A in Downtown New Smyrna Beach as Lytel Avenue. Next, the route crosses the Intracoastal Waterway and Callalisa Creek before heading southbound. After the 2 bridges, the road becomes 3rd Avenue, the northern terminus of Saxon Drive as the first right after Callalisa Creek. East of Indian River Village Shopping Center, the road turns southward and becomes Atlantic Avenue. At the intersection of 27th Avenue, the road becomes 2 lanes wide. Less than a mile south of New Smyrna Beach, Saxon Drive ends. At Bethune Beach, the road slightly turns away from the Atlantic Ocean. The road becomes Turtle Mound Road at that point. After Bethune Beach, the road is midway between the Intracoastal Waterway and the Atlantic Ocean. At this point, a gate brings access to Canaveral National Seashore. It passes through the ghost town of Eldora. The road ends as a dead end at a beach.

St. Johns County
County Road A1A is a  spur route of SR A1A in St. Augustine Beach that runs closer to the Atlantic Ocean than SR A1A. It runs northeast from SR A1A, but begins to straighten out between John Drive and a private driveway south of F Street. The closest thing resembling a major intersection is 16th Street. After passing by the St Johns County Ocean Pier, the road intersects Pope Road and leaves the city limits, where it enters Anastasia State Park, and makes a sharp curve to the west. Once the road leaves the park, it features an exceptionally long west-to-north turning ramp towards SR A1A, but ends at the intersection of SRs A1A and 312.

References in popular culture

A1A is mentioned in the 1990 Vanilla Ice song Ice Ice Baby with the lyrics "A1A (Beachfront Avenue)"; in Miami's South Beach, A1A is named Collins Avenue, but "Beachfront Avenue" is a common nickname.
A1A, called Ocean Boulevard in the town of Golden Beach, was referred to in the title of Eric Clapton's 1974 album 461 Ocean Boulevard.
A1A is the title of a 1974 album by Jimmy Buffett; one of the album's tracks, "Trying to Reason with Hurricane Season", also mentions the road.
A1A was mentioned in Kenny Chesney's songs "Outta Here" and "Coastal"
A1A was mentioned in Patty Griffin's song "Florida"

References

External links

Scenic and Historic A1A Coastal Byway
Florida Scenic Highways; Broward County A1A Scenic Highway

A1A
State highways in Florida
Roads in Key West, Florida
State Roads in Monroe County, Florida
State Roads in Miami-Dade County, Florida
State Roads in Miami
State Roads in Miami Beach, Florida
State Roads in Broward County, Florida
State Roads in Palm Beach County, Florida
State Roads in Martin County, Florida
State Roads in St. Lucie County, Florida
State Roads in Indian River County, Florida
State Roads in Vero Beach, Florida
State Roads in Brevard County, Florida
State Roads in Volusia County, Florida
State Roads in Flagler County, Florida
State Roads in St. Johns County, Florida
State Roads in Duval County, Florida
State Roads in Jacksonville, Florida
State Roads in Nassau County, Florida
A1A
A1A
County roads in Martin County, Florida
County roads in Palm Beach County, Florida
County roads in St. Johns County, Florida
0001
1945 establishments in Florida
Florida Scenic Highways